Wildcat Mountain is a mountain located in Coos County, northern New Hampshire, United States. The mountain is part of the Carter-Moriah Range of the White Mountains, on the east side of Pinkham Notch.  Wildcat Mountain faces Carter Dome across Carter Notch to the northeast, and Mount Washington across Pinkham Notch to the west.

Wildcat Mountain has five summits — A, B, C, D, and E — along Wildcat Ridge, which curves two miles (3 km) to the south and west.

The Wildcat Mountain Ski Area is one of the best-known alpine skiing resorts in New England, with lifts from the base on NH Route 16 in Pinkham Notch  up to the D summit. Cut in 1972, it is one of the best-known routes in the extensive trail system maintained by the Jackson Ski Touring Foundation.

See also

 List of mountains in New Hampshire
 Four-thousand footers
 White Mountain National Forest

External links
 
 Peakbagger.com: Wildcat Mountain
 Peakbagger.com: Wildcat “D”
 Summitpost.org: Wildcat Mountain
 AMC: Hiking Wildcat Mountain
 hikethewhites.com: Wildcat Mountain
 Wildcat Mountain Ski Area
 TrailBlazersNE Wildcat Mountain Trail Profile
 Jackson Ski Touring Foundation: Wildcat Valley Trail
  Wildcat Mountain - New England's Alpine CCC Ski Trails

Wildcat Mountain
Wildcat Mountain
New England Four-thousand footers
Mountains on the Appalachian Trail